Dr. Noa Regev (born February 17, 1982) is an Israeli lecturer in film, a cultural scholar and researcher, and the CEO of the Jerusalem Cinematheque – Israel Film Archive, and the Jerusalem Film Festival.

Biography 
Noa Regev was born in Tel Aviv in 1982, to Moti Regev, a Hi-tech professional, and Avital Regev-Shoshani, a copy editor. She received her primary school education at the Tel Aviv School of Arts (1988-1997). She attended Igal Alon High School in Ramat Hasharon, from which she graduated in 2000 with a major in Film Studies. In 2001 she was recruited to the IDF and served in the Israeli Air Force as an officer in an air brigade until 2003.

Academic activity 
In 2003, Regev began her studies towards a BA at the Steve Tisch School of Film and Television at Tel Aviv University. In 2005, she received the Rector's Award of Excellence from Tel Aviv University. In 2006, she completed her BA studies cum laude.

From 2006 to 2009, she taught Film Studies and prepared students for their matriculation in Film at the Tel Aviv Ironi Aleph School and worked as a teaching assistant at the Tel Aviv University Department of Film. In 2007, she was a lecturer at the Open University in the Department of Language, Literature, and Art. In 2009, she received her MA cum laude from the Department of Film and Television at Tel Aviv University. That same year she began lecturing in Cultural Studies, Production and Creativity at the Department of Film at Sapir Academic College. In addition, she began lecturing in the Department of Film and Television at the Faculty of Arts at Tel Aviv University, which she continues to do today.

Regev also won the Rector's Award of Excellence for Teachers. In 2011, she began to serve as a graduate advisor for MA students at Tel Aviv University's Department of Film. In 2013, she completed her PhD studies and was certified by the Department of Film and Television at Tel Aviv University. The topic of her research was "Children's Films" and dealt with "The Status of Children's Films within the multi-system of Cinema", in its generic definition and its dynamic relationship with other cinematic models.

Cinema industry activity 
Noa Regev discovered her passion for film at the age of 15 when she began working at the Tel Aviv Cinematheque, fulfilling various roles. In 2005, as part of her work, she staffed a few production roles at the Docaviv Festival. From 2010–2011, she directed the International Students' Film Festival in Tel Aviv. From 2012–2013, she served as the Director of the Holon Cinematheque.

In late 2013, she was appointed CEO of the Association "Jerusalem Cinematheque – Israeli Film Archive and Jerusalem Film Festival", which was responsible for management and operation of the Cinematheque and the Jerusalem Film Festival. In 2015 she served as a jury on the panel of the Munich Student Film Festival. In 2018, Regev served as a jury at the Berlin International Film Festival.

References

External links 
 Noa regev at Imdb

1982 births
Living people
Israeli Air Force personnel
Israeli film critics
Israeli women film critics
Academic staff of Sapir Academic College
Tel Aviv University alumni
Academic staff of Tel Aviv University